Kim Esty is a Canadian Eurodance musician. She is best known for her 1993 song, "Summer in the Street" which reached number 5 on the Canadian RPM Dance chart. She is also known for collaborating with The Boomtang Boys on two singles, the top 10 hit, "Squeeze Toy" and the top 30 hit, "Pictures".

Discography

Albums

Singles

Guest singles with The Boomtang Boys

Awards and nominations

References

Living people
Canadian women singers
Musicians from Toronto
Eurodance musicians
Canadian dance musicians
Canadian techno musicians
Year of birth missing (living people)
Place of birth missing (living people)